Ladj Ly (born 19 March 1980 in Paris) is a French film director and screenwriter. He won a Jury Prize in Cannes Film Festival for Les Misérables in 2019. The film was nominated for the Academy Award for Best Foreign Film.

Biography
Ly's parents are from Mali and he grew up in Montfermeil, a district of Bosquets. He started making films with his friends Kim Chapiron, Romain Gavras, and JR, in the collective Kourtrajmé.

He directed his first films, notably for Oxmo Puccino, and his first documentaries,  (365 days in Clichy-Montfermeil), filmed after the 2005 French riots; Go Fast Connexion; and 365 jours au Mali (365 days in Mali).

In 2011, Ly was given a three-year prison sentence for kidnapping and false imprisonment. In 2012, the sentence was reduced on appeal to two years imprisonment, and one year suspended sentence.

Les Misérables is the first non-documentary film he directed. The film received many awards, notably at the Clermont-Ferrand International Short Film Festival and a nomination for the César Award for Best Short Film in 2018.

In 2018 in Montfermeil, Ly created a free film school, called "L'école Kourtrajmé".

References

External links

French people of Malian descent
Living people
1978 births
French film directors
French screenwriters
People from Montfermeil